Riñihue is a hamlet in Los Lagos, Chile. It is located south of the Tralcán Mount in the west side of Riñihue Lake. In early 20th century Riñihue grew out as a settlement due to the exploitation of wood in Riñihue Lake. Riñihue was the first Chilean lakeshore settlement to be reached by the railroad. The hamlet is known for being flooded during the Riñihuazo.

Riñihue is served by El Vergel Airport.

Populated lakeshore places in Chile
Hamlets in Chile
Populated places in Valdivia Province
Mapuche language